Morgan Patrick Crowe (5 March 1907 – 8 April 1993) was a rugby union centre who played thirteen times for  between 1929–34.  He played his club rugby for Leicester Tigers and Lansdowne.

He played for Richmond Hospital in the Dublin Hospitals Rugby Cup. In the 1930 final against Sir Patrick Dun's Hospital he fractured his clavicle, ruling him out of the 1930 Lions tour of New Zealand, which he had been selected for. 

A doctor by profession his work took him to the Leicester Royal Infirmary. Crowe made his Leicester Tigers debut on 1 October 1932 against Coventry at Welford Road. Crowe became Leicester's regular goal kicker in the 1933/34 season and was the club's top scorer with 87 points across 30 games. His final game for Leicester was on 23 April 1935 against Exeter.

Crowe also briefly played football for UCD in the Leinster Senior League.

References

Irish rugby union players
Ireland international rugby union players
Rugby union centres
1907 births
1993 deaths
Leicester Tigers players
Leinster Rugby players
Rugby union players from Dublin (city)
Irish expatriate rugby union players
Irish expatriate sportspeople in England
Expatriate rugby union players in England
20th-century Irish medical doctors
University College Dublin R.F.C. players